The All-Ireland Senior B Hurling Championship of 1993 was the 20th staging of Ireland's secondary hurling knock-out competition.  Meath won the championship, beating London 2-16 to 1-16 in the final at the Emerald GAA Grounds, Ruislip.

References

 Donegan, Des, The Complete Handbook of Gaelic Games (DBA Publications Limited, 2005).

1993
B